George Arthur Harney (June 1, 1890 – May 5, 1959) was an American baseball pitcher in the Negro leagues. He played from 1923 to 1931 with the Chicago American Giants.

Harney pitched for Gilkerson's Union Giants in 1922 before joining the Chicago American Giants in April 1923. He remained with the American Giants through 1931.

References

External links
 and Seamheads

1890 births
Chicago American Giants players
Baseball players from Alabama
1959 deaths
Sportspeople from Bessemer, Alabama
Baseball players from Chicago
20th-century African-American sportspeople
Baseball pitchers